Say It with Sables is a 1928 silent drama film directed by Frank Capra and produced by Harry Cohn for Columbia Pictures. Columbia no longer has a negative or print of this film, so the film is considered a lost film. Various film festivals have run a surviving trailer for the film during retrospectives of Capra's work.

Plot
Doug Caswell (Arthur Rankin) falls for Irene Gordon (Margaret Livingston). Irene happens to be the mistress of his wealthy father, John Caswell (Francis X. Bushman), and it's up to Doug's stepmother, Helen (Helene Chadwick), to put things right.

Cast
 Francis X. Bushman as John Caswell 
 Helene Chadwick as Helen Caswell 
 Margaret Livingston as Irene Gordon 
 Arthur Rankin as Doug Caswell 
 Alphonse Ethier as Mitchell (as Alphonz Ethier) 
 Edna Mae Cooper as Maid

See also
List of lost films

References

External links
Say It With Sables at IMDB
Say It With Sables at SilentEra

1928 films
American black-and-white films
Columbia Pictures films
1928 drama films
Films directed by Frank Capra
American silent feature films
Lost American films
Silent American drama films
1928 lost films
Lost drama films
1920s American films